The Jewish Community Secondary School (JCoSS) is a state-funded Jewish secondary school in New Barnet, London. Established in 2010, it is the first cross-denominational secondary school in the UK. It was established after Dr. Helena Miller, then with the Leo Baeck College (and now with the London School of Jewish Studies) observed that while her son had gone to JFS, a nearby Jewish school, many of his friends had not been able to attend because of oversubscription and halachic requirements.  In 2001, she initiated a process of community engagement and consultation which led ultimately to the successful proposal for a new faith school. Construction of the school began in April 2009.

JCoSS opened a year at a time, with up to 180 students joining Year 7 each year until the school was fully populated with around 1360 students. Its sixth form opened in 2012. The school, whose headteacher is Dr Melanie Lee, has specialist status in science. It cost £50 million to build, £36 million of which was funded by the government, and is the most expensive state-funded secondary school to be built in the UK. Gerald Ronson, a business tycoon and philanthropist, helped in the fundraising drive and is the president of the JCoSS Trust. The Pears Special Resource Provision (PSRP) at the school has places for up to 49 children (seven places each year) with autistic spectrum disorders. Norwood, a Jewish charity, is providing some of the services at the PSRP.

Before the school opened, several Orthodox Rabbis expressed concern over JCoSS's compatibility with their faith. At the construction ceremony, Ed Balls, who at the time was schools secretary, said the school would play an important role in dealing with discrimination and prejudice.

In 2019, JCoSS was named the Sunday Times' London State Secondary School of the Year, in recognition of their record breaking results in GCSE and A Levels.



References

Further reading 

Kummer, Sophie. "£46m funding bid for new Jewish school". times-series.co.uk. 2 June 2005. Accessed 11 April 2011.
Dutta, Neeta. "First inclusive Jewish secondary school". times-series.co.uk. 9 February 2006. Accessed 11 April 2011.
Lowe, Rebecca. "JCoSS ground breaking ceremony: speeches in full". times-series.co.uk. 22 April 2009. Accessed 8 August 2011.

External links 

2010 in London
Secondary schools in the London Borough of Barnet
Educational institutions established in 2010
Jewish schools in England
2010 establishments in England
Voluntary aided schools in London
New Barnet